Magdalena Ocotlán  is a town and municipality in Oaxaca in south-western Mexico. The municipality covers an area of 24.24 km². 
It is part of the Ocotlán District in the south of the Valles Centrales Region

As of 2005, the municipality had a total population of 1060.

References

Municipalities of Oaxaca